Lewis Anderson (May 7, 1890 – May 4, 1958) was an American middle-distance runner. He competed in the men's 1500 metres at the 1912 Summer Olympics.

References

External links
 

1890 births
1958 deaths
Athletes (track and field) at the 1912 Summer Olympics
American male middle-distance runners
Olympic track and field athletes of the United States
Place of birth missing
People from Geneva, Nebraska
20th-century American people